The 2007–08 UC Irvine Anteaters men's basketball team represented the University of California, Irvine during the 2007–08 NCAA Division I men's basketball season. The Anteaters were led by 11th year head coach Pat Douglass and played at the Bren Events Center. They were members of the Big West Conference.

Previous season 
The 2006–07 UC Irvine Anteaters men's basketball team finished the season with a record of 15–18 and 6–8 in Big West play.

Off-Season

Incoming transfers

2007 recruiting class

Roster

Schedule

|-
!colspan=9 style=|Regular Season

|-
!colspan=9 style=| Big West Conference tournament

Source

Awards and honors
Patrick Sanders
All-Big West First Team
Darren Fells
All-Big West Second Team

References

UC Irvine Anteaters men's basketball seasons
UC Irvine
UC Irvine Anteaters
UC Irvine Anteaters